Rœux is a commune in the Pas-de-Calais department in the Hauts-de-France region of France.

Geography
The junction of the A1 and A26 autoroutes is 1/2 mile north of the commune. Rœux station has rail connections to Arras and Douai.

Population

Places of interest
 The church of St. Hilaire, rebuilt along with much of the village after the First World War.
 The Commonwealth War Graves Commission cemeteries.

See also
Communes of the Pas-de-Calais department

References

External links

 The CWGC military cemetery
 The CWGC communal cemetery

Roeux